Cape Little is a cape at the eastern extremity of the peninsula between Wright Inlet and Keller Inlet, on the east coast of Palmer Land, Antarctica. It was probably seen from the air by members of the United States Antarctic Service who photographed Wright Inlet in December 1940. The cape was photographed from the air during 1947 by the Ronne Antarctic Research Expedition (RARE) under Finn Ronne, who in conjunction with the Falkland Islands Dependencies Survey charted it from the ground. It was named by Ronne for Delbert M. Little, Assistant Chief for Operations, U.S. Weather Bureau, who arranged the program for sending weather reports from the RARE.

References

Headlands of Palmer Land